Nippes is the fifth borough of Cologne, Germany. Nippes was incorporated into the city of Cologne in 1888 and the district was created in 1975. A large Ford Europe production plant is located in Niehl, the north-eastern part of the district.

Nippes borders the Cologne boroughs of Chorweiler to the north, Mülheim to the east, Innenstadt to the south, and Ehrenfeld to the south-west.

Subdivisions 
Nippes consists of seven Stadtteile (city parts):

Transport 

Nippes is served by numerous railway stations and main highways. Stations include Köln-Nippes, Köln Geldernstraße/Parkgürtel, and Köln-Longerich, as well as numerous light rail stations on Cologne Stadtbahn lines 12, 15, 16, and 18. Bundesautobahn 57 connects Nippes to the Cologne motorway ring.

Rhine bridges  
  Mülheimer Brücke

Notable people 
 Fritz Schramma (born 1947), mayor of Cologne from 2000 until 2009
 Gaby Köster (born 1961), actress and cabaret artist

References

External links 

 Official webpage of the district 

 
Boroughs and quarters of Cologne